Brocklebank is a surname. Notable people with the surname include:

Bob Brocklebank (1908-1981), English football manager
Daniel Brocklebank (shipbuilder) (1742-1801), shipbuilder, first in North America and then at Whitehaven
Daniel Brocklebank (born 1979), British actor
Edmund Brocklebank (1882–1949), British politician
John Brocklebank (1915–1974), English baronet and cricketer
Ted Brocklebank (born 1942), British politician
Thomas Brocklebank (1899–1953), English baronet and cricketer

See also
Brocklebank baronets

English-language surnames